The Rise and Fall of the Brown Buffalo is a 2017 American documentary film directed by Phillip Rodriguez, and written by Phillip Rodriguez, and David Ventura.

Plot summary 
The film documents the life and career of Oscar Zeta Acosta, an American attorney, politician, novelist, and Chicano Movement activist who was fictionalized as Dr. Gonzo in Hunter S. Thompson's Fear and Loathing in Las Vegas.  The documentary was developed and directed by Phillip Rodriguez over many years and consists of stills and film footage interspersed with dramatic reenactments. It is based in part on Acosta's autobiography with the similar title, Autobiography of a Brown Buffalo.

Cast 
Jesse Celedon as Oscar Zeta Acosta
Jeff Harms as Hunter S. Thompson
Steve Ledesma as young Oscar Zeta Acosta

Streaming 
The film is available online through pbs.org and Kanopy

References

External links

NPR radio programme including discussion of the film
IMDb
Rotten Tomatoes

2017 films
Oscar Zeta Acosta
2017 documentary films
American documentary films
2010s English-language films
2010s American films